Judith Mary Hillier (née Preston) is a British physicist who is Associate Professor of Science Education at the University of Oxford. She is a lead tutor for the Postgraduate Certificate in Education programme in science and serves as vice president of Kellogg College, Oxford. She was awarded the Marie Curie-Sklodowska medal by the Institute of Physics in 2021 for her support of women in physics.

Early life and education 
Hillier studied physics and astronomy at the University of St Andrews, graduating with a Master of Science (MSci) degree. She moved to the University of Leeds for graduate studies, where her PhD research investigated condensed matter physics with experimental work conducted at the Institut Laue–Langevin. After a career break, Hillier joined the University of Oxford where she retrained as a secondary school teacher and was awarded a Postgraduate Certificate in Education (PGCE).

Research and career 
Hillier taught physics at a comprehensive school in Oxford, where she was appointed a coordinator of the Key Stage 3 curriculum. She eventually returned to academia, focussing on the teachers, recruitment and retention of physics teachers at the University of Oxford. She was appointed an Associate Professor of Science Education and Fellow of Kellogg College, Oxford in 2010. She founded the Oxfordshire Schools Physics Partnership, which supports physics teachers. In particular, Hillier investigated professional development activities and classroom explanations.

Hillier has been involved with the Institute of Physics throughout her career. In particular, she has concentrated on gender and diversity within the physics community. Hillier has been responsible for the evaluation of the Conference for Undergraduate Women in Physics (CUWiP) since it launched in the United Kingdom in 2015. She found that women felt a stronger sense of belonging to the physics community after attending the conference. Her evaluation is used to inform the design of future conferences, and ensured that the conference remains a key date in UK physics' calendar. To identify obstacles and solutions to gender imbalances within the scientific community, Hillier has studied the experiences of successful women scientists.

Selected publications

Awards and honours
Hillier was awarded the Marie Curie-Sklodowska medal by the Institute of Physics in 2021 for her support of women in physics.

References 

Alumni of the University of Leeds
Fellows of Kellogg College, Oxford
Living people
Year of birth missing (living people)
21st-century British physicists
British women academics